Honey-roasted peanuts is a salt-, sugar- and honey-flavored peanut snack food that is provided as a mass-produced product line by several nut and snack food companies, such as Planters, The Sun Valley Nut Co,  and King Nut.

History 
Before the 1980s, legumes were glazed before being roasted, resulting in a messy, sticky product that "lost both flavor and color", according to the News and Observer. Planters introduced a honey roasted nut mix in 1985.

In 1987, former North Carolina State University food scientist Bill Hoover, working in his home basement lab after he retired, developed a method to glaze the nuts after roasting. Hoover's method roasts the legumes first, then while the nuts are between 160 and 350 degrees, coats them with the glaze. The resulting product is less sticky and retains freshness longer. Hoover sold the patent to Anheuser-Busch but retained royalties.

Airlines
In the United States, some airlines such as Delta Air Lines and Southwest Airlines have provided free snack-sized bags of honey roasted peanuts to its customers on domestic flights. This became a longstanding tradition with Southwest Airlines, but in 2018 the company discontinued providing peanuts in the interest of protecting those who have peanut allergies. King Nut has provided honey roasted peanuts and many other snacks to several airlines based in the United States.

See also
 Beer Nuts – an American snack food brand consisting of peanuts with a sweet-and-salty glaze
 List of peanut dishes
 List of snack foods

Notes

References

Further reading

External links
 Visiting King Nut – Snack Provider to the World's Airlines. Airline Reporter. March 25, 2015.

Peanut dishes
Snack foods